The March of the Family with God for Liberty (Portuguese: Marcha da Família com Deus pela Liberdade) was a series of public demonstrations in Brazil. The first march was held in São Paulo on March 19, 1964, on St Joseph's Day, Saint Joseph being the patron saint of the family, and attracted an estimated 300,000 to 500,000 attendees.

Mobilization 
The march was sparked by a speech by then President João Goulart in Rio de Janeiro on March 13 in which he called for political reforms including rent control; wealth tax; expropriation of land within 10 km of roads, railroads and dams, and the nationalization of oil refineries. For years, the mild reforms had been seen by the US government as threatening to its financial interests and hegemony in the region. Goulart had also called for nationalization of foreign mining concerns, such as US-owned Hanna Mining. To discredit Goulart, the US played on exaggerated fears of communism through extensive propaganda supplied via McCarthyist journalists such as Clarence W. Hall and CIA-funded figures such as Father Patrick Peyton, who helped exaggerate the threat of communism. The anticommunist propaganda instilled in Brazilians the specter of an imminent "Red" takeover during the Cold War while the US government's financial and geopolitical motivations for removing Goulart remained hidden. The media-fed fears prompted Catholic women, especially the group Campanha da Mulher pela Democracia (CAMDE Women's Campaign for Democracy), to organize the march at Praça da Sé, in São Paulo, and parallel marches elsewhere. The marchers demanded Goulart's impeachment and expressed strong opposition to his reformist agenda. The march was a precursor to the Brazilian coup d'état and prepared the public to accept a coup against Goulart.

The US-backed coup installed a military dictatorship that lasted 21 years and arrested, exiled, brutally tortured, and killed thousands. Despite the substantial investment in anticommunist propaganda, no evidence of such a threat ever emerged. Their amnesia was aided by the 1979 Amnesty Law, which granted immunity to the regime's torturers, as well as by calls from former regime officials to "turn the page." 

The amnesia is seen in the occasional parade commemorating the dictatorship, usually by the right-wing military. In 2014, commemorative marches were held in São Paulo and Rio de Janeiro in support of the 1964 marches, the latter attracting around 150 attendees and around 50 counterdemonstrators.

References 

1964 in Brazil
Military dictatorship in Brazil
Protest marches
Anti-communism in Brazil